Jefferson Alexis Castillo Marin (born 10 June 1990) is a Chilean footballer that currently plays for Santiago Wanderers in the Primera B de Chile.

External links
 
 

1990 births
Living people
Chilean footballers
Curicó Unido footballers
Puerto Montt footballers
Rangers de Talca footballers
Santiago Wanderers footballers
Deportes Copiapó footballers
Primera B de Chile players
Chilean Primera División players
Sportspeople from Valparaíso
Association football midfielders